Late Night Shopping is a 2001 comedy film funded by FilmFour Productions, centering on a group of friends who all work the graveyard shifts.

Plot

Sean, Vincent, Jody and Lenny work graveyard shifts in various soul-killing jobs (the hospital, a supermarket, a factory and a call centre, respectively) and meet up in a cafe after work to kill time. Apart from this each has very little of a life. Sean hasn't met his girlfriend for three weeks and is beginning to wonder if she still lives in his apartment. Vincent is a serial womanizer. Lenny, formerly a writer of porn stories, can't pluck up the courage to ask out his attractive workmate Gail. Jody, unknown to the others, has been fired from her job, but still shows up after her "shift" every night to talk.

At the hospital, Sean strikes up a friendship with the girlfriend of a coma patient; she confides in him that at the time of the accident she was about to end the relationship. Later, the two sleep together.

Meanwhile, Vincent picks up an attractive young woman, who turns out to be Sean's girlfriend Madeline. Several days later Vincent's colleague Joe has a fatal heart attack; As he is taken to the hospital, Vincent accompanies him and runs into Sean. In a moment of humanity he confesses to have slept with Madeline; Sean reacts first with disbelief, then with violence. Returning to his flat, he discovers that Madeline has moved out.

Sean receives an anonymous phone call and tracing it discovers that it came from a small town where Madeline's friend has an aunt.  Sean, Lenny and Jody decide to drive there to find Madeline. On the way there they spot Vincent on the side of the road; they pick him up, and Sean says they're even after crushing Vincent's favourite possession - a watch that belonged to Errol Flynn.

Unable to find Madeline the group gather in a cafe and Jody confesses that she lost her job. After Vincent and Lenny leave to play crazy golf, Jody runs into Madeline and sets up a meeting between her and Sean; the two of them discuss the issues in their relationship and come to the conclusion that everything is over.

On the way back the group stops at a motorway service station; Lenny asks Gail out and is turned down, but still sees this as progress.  Madeline and Sean argue over who gets to keep the flat, but later kiss when taking photobooth pictures together.

The final scene has Gail finally manage to switch the irritating radio station; the radio plays a noticeably more modern and upbeat song.

Cast
Luke de Woolfson ...  Sean
James Lance ...  Vincent
Kate Ashfield ...  Jody
Enzo Cilenti ...  Lenny
Heike Makatsch ...  Madeline Zozzocolovich
Shauna Macdonald ...  Gail
Sienna Guillory ...  Susie
Laurie Ventry ...  Joe
Claire Harman ...  Wendy

Reception
The film attracted mixed reviews. In a largely critical Sight & Sound review, Andy Richards highlighted the "charmlessness" of the characters and the "trite" pre-credits, Trainspotting-esque voice over.  Although the film was set in Glasgow, only the peripheral characters actually spoke with a regional accent. Overall, Richards brands the film "impoverished in ideas." However, in an article for the BBC, Michael Thomson praises the "regular supply of smart ideas from writer Jack Lothian and director Saul Metzstein", while acknowledging the "plot-contrivance and phoniness" of the final section.

External links

References

2001 films
2001 comedy films
Scottish films
British comedy films
Films scored by Alex Heffes
Films shot in Scotland
Film4 Productions films
English-language Scottish films
2000s English-language films
2000s British films